Halanaerobium fermentans is a Gram-negative and strictly anaerobic bacterium from the genus of Halanaerobium which has been isolated from puffer fish ovaries.

References

Clostridia
Bacteria described in 2000